The 2004 JPMorgan Chase Open was a women's tennis tournament played on outdoor hard courts in Carson, California in the United States that was part of the Tier II of the 2004 WTA Tour. It was the 31st edition of the tournament and held from July 19 through July 25, 2004. Third-seeded Lindsay Davenport won the singles title and earned $93,000 first-prize money.

Finals

Singles

 Lindsay Davenport defeated  Serena Williams, 6–1, 6–3
It was Davenport's 4th singles title of the year and the 42nd of her career.

Doubles

 Nadia Petrova /  Meghann Shaughnessy defeated  Conchita Martínez /  Virginia Ruano Pascual, 6–7(2–7), 6–4, 6–3

References

External links
 ITF tournament edition details
 Tournament draws

JPMorgan Chase Open
JPMorgan Chase Open
JPMorgan Chase Open
2004 in American tennis